Alexander Tejera (born January 29, 1996) is an American soccer player who plays as a forward for Chattanooga Red Wolves in USL League One.

Career

Youth
Tejera attended Ossining High School, and was their youngest starter in varsity history and was named league MVP in addition to being an All-League and All-Section selection. Tejera also played with the New York Red Bulls academy from 2011 to 2014.

College
In 2014, Tejera committed to playing college soccer at Siena College. In his freshman season, he was named Second Team All-MAAC and only unanimous MAAC All-Rookie Team selection, College Soccer News Third Team All-Freshman selection, College Sports Madness MAAC Freshman of the Year, and was a NSCAA/Continental Tire All-Northeast Region Third Team honoree. Between 2015 and 2017, he scored 14 goals in 52 appearances.

While at college, Tejera also appeared in the USL PDL with New York Red Bulls U23, making 22 regular season appearances and scoring eleven goals between 2015 and 2017.

Early career
2018 saw Tejera play with NPSL side Kingston Stockade, scoring two goals in four games, before suffering a season-ending injury. He later spent a year with lower-league Uruguayan side Mar de Fondo, before returning to the United States and spending two seasons with UPSL with Atlético Olympians following a trial with Greenville Triumph.

Tejera's career in 2022 saw him appear in the NISA with Valley United, making eight league appearances and scoring two goals. Also appearing in the Lamar Hunt U.S. Open Cup against Phoenix Rising.

Chattanooga Red Wolves
On July 12, 2022, Tejera signed with USL League One club Chattanooga Red Wolves. He made his debut on July 16, 2022, appearing as a 75th–minute substitute during a 2–1 win over North Carolina FC.

Personal life
Born in the United States, Tejera is of Uruguayan and Italian descent.

References

External links
 Profile at Siena College

1996 births
Living people
People from Ossining, New York
Soccer players from New York (state)
American soccer players
American people of Uruguayan descent
American people of Italian descent
American expatriate soccer players
American expatriate sportspeople in Uruguay
Association football forwards
Chattanooga Red Wolves SC players
Expatriate footballers in Uruguay
National Independent Soccer Association players
New York Red Bulls U-23 players
Siena Saints men's soccer players
USL League One players